The 1994 DFB-Pokal Final decided the winner of the 1993–94 DFB-Pokal, the 51st season of Germany's premier knockout football cup competition. It was played on 14 May 1994 at the Olympiastadion in Berlin. Werder Bremen won the match 3–1 against Rot-Weiss Essen to claim their third cup title.

Route to the final
The DFB-Pokal was a 76 teams in a single-elimination knockout cup competition. There were a total of six rounds leading up to the final. In the first round, some teams were given a bye. Teams were drawn against each other, and the winner after 90 minutes would advance. If still tied, 30 minutes of extra time was played. If the score was still level, a penalty shoot-out was used to determine the winner.

Note: In all results below, the score of the finalist is given first (H: home; A: away).

Match

Details

References

External links
 Match report at kicker.de 
 Match report at WorldFootball.net
 Match report at Fussballdaten.de 

SV Werder Bremen matches
Rot-Weiss Essen matches
1993–94 in German football cups
1994
May 1994 sports events in Europe
1994 in Berlin
Football competitions in Berlin